"Ode to the Confederate Dead" is a long poem by the American poet-critic Allen Tate published in 1928 in Tate's first book of poems, Mr. Pope and Other Poems. It is one of Tate's best-known poems and considered by some critics to be his most "important". Heavily influenced by the work of T. S. Eliot, this Modernist poem takes place in a graveyard in the South where the narrator grieves the loss of the Confederate soldiers buried there. However, unlike the "ode" to the Confederate dead written by the 19th-century American poet Henry Timrod, Tate's "Ode" is not a straightforward ode. Instead, Tate uses the graveyard and the dead Confederate soldiers as a metaphor for his narrator's troubled state of mind, and the poem charts the narrator's dark stream of consciousness, as he contemplates (or tries to avoid contemplating) his own mortality.

Analysis
Tate wrote an essay, "Narcissus as Narcissus," in which he analyzes the poem with a close reading that is an important example of the close reading method practiced by Tate and the New Critics. In the essay, Tate says that "Ode to the Confederate Dead" is "'about' solipsism, a philosophical doctrine which says that we create the world in the act of perceiving it; or about Narcissism, or any other ism that denotes the failure of the human personality to function objectively in nature and society." 

The editors of The Norton Anthology of Modern Poetry note, "[Tate's] friend Hart Crane said of the 'Ode,' the real subject was Tate's 'own dead emotion.'" The editors go on to state, "[Tate's] constant excoriation of solipsism and narcissism . . .reflects a criticism not only of the creatures who surround him but of himself."

Influence
Robert Lowell's poem "For the Union Dead" referred to, and was partly a response to, Tate's "Ode to the Confederate Dead".

References

American poems
1928 poems